Cohoke is an unincorporated community in King William County, Virginia, United States. It is the namesake and reported location of the Cohoke Light.

References

Unincorporated communities in Virginia
Unincorporated communities in King William County, Virginia